Ebba Charlotte Hermansson (born 14 May 1996) is a Swedish politician of the Sweden Democrats. She was Member of the Riksdag from September 2018 until her resignation in December 2021. She was taking up seat number 331 in the Riksdag for the constituency of Skåne Western. She was also Baby of the House from taking office.

She began her political career in the Sweden Democratic Youth after the 2014 general election. She was chosen as the Sweden Democrats' gender equality spokesperson in August 2018.

References 

Members of the Riksdag from the Sweden Democrats
People from Gothenburg
1996 births
Living people
Members of the Riksdag 2018–2022
21st-century Swedish women politicians
Women members of the Riksdag